The Robert O. Jones House is a Queen Anne-styled house built in 1897 in Waukesha, Wisconsin. It was listed on the National Register of Historic Places in 1983 and on the State Register of Historic Places in 1989.

Robert Jones was a postal clerk in Waukesha.  The architects Wolf and Waegli designed this house for him and it was built in 1897.  It is two stories, with Queen Anne styling in the asymmetric facade, the hip-and-gable roof, the shingle-work in the gable ends, and the wraparound porch.  The porch is especially striking, with its  sunburst gable and the corner pavilion.

References

Houses on the National Register of Historic Places in Wisconsin
National Register of Historic Places in Waukesha County, Wisconsin
Houses in Waukesha County, Wisconsin
Buildings and structures in Waukesha, Wisconsin
Houses completed in 1897